The Viaduct Urban Garden is an elevated park and garden in Leeds, United Kingdom. The park was completed in 2023, after it was converted from a disused railway viaduct.

Background
The Monk Bridge viaduct on which the park is located was constructed in the 1800s, presumed to be around the same time as the opening of the Leeds Central railway station in 1854. Leeds opted to close one of its central train stations in 1961 and amalgamated all the rail to Leeds railway station, which is now the only central railway station in Leeds. Leeds Central was then demolished years later, its site has now become the business district and public square, Wellington Place. 

The viaduct was partly demolished, leaving around 200 meters of what would have been around half a kilometre long when the station was in use. Leeds' south is dotted with railway viaducts, both in use and abandoned. Following completion of New York City's High Line, a greenway was suggested on another viaduct, but construction is yet to start on that project. Meanwhile, a nearby developer purchased a much shorter disused viaduct, which has now become the Viaduct Urban Garden.

Work on converting the viaduct began in 2022 and opened the first phase of the park in 2023.

References

Urban public parks
Gardens in England
Parks in England